The Luxembourg Women's Cup is the annual cup competition of women's football teams in Luxembourg. It was first contested in 2001/02 and is held by the Luxembourg Football Federation.

List of finals
The list of finals:

References

External links
 Cup at FLF
 Cup at women.soccerway.com
 List of Cup Finals at Fussball-Lux

Lux
2
Recurring sporting events established in 2002
2002 establishments in Luxembourg